Sintoxicated is the fourth studio album by Jamaican recording artist Tanya Stephens. The album was Stephens' only release with Warner Music Sweden-Irie Records, released only in Sweden. Outside Sweden, the album is very difficult to locate.

Track listing

Chart history

Swedish Album Charts - 39

References

2001 albums
Tanya Stephens albums